KHGN-TV is the cable station for the Harlingen Consolidated Independent School District, located in Harlingen, Texas.

It can be seen in Harlingen on Spectrum Cable Channel 17.

History
The station began broadcast in August 2004. The staff included the station manager and a television production technician. The station employed a student worker from each of the high schools.  A writer/videographer position was later added.

Programming
Programming includes original productions about school and district events.  Shows aired are "HCISD Highlights," "Career Pathways," "News You Can Use," and "Bedtime Stories."

Football, volleyball, soccer, and basketball games are shown on the station.  Productions from the Harlingen High School and Harlingen High School South Media Technology students also air on the station.

Link: https://web.archive.org/web/20081230175101/http://www.harlingen.isd.tenet.edu/khgn/weeklyschedulehomepage.html

Awards
The station has won several Texas Public Schools Association Awards, including a 2006 Crystal Commendation Award and a Gold Star Award for a Texas Public Schools Week video.

External links
Official Link: http://tec.hcisd.org/khgn
Time Warner Future

Television stations in Texas